Bahrain competed at the 2012 Summer Olympics in London, United Kingdom from 27 July to 12 August 2012. This nation marked its eighth appearance in the  Summer Olympics. However, there were concerns about the nation's participation to the games due to its recent political uprising.

Bahrain Olympic Committee selected a team of 12 athletes to the Games, 8 women and 4 men, to compete only in athletics, shooting, and swimming. For the first time in its history, Bahrain was represented by more female than male athletes at an Olympic event, which did not happen before for an Arab gold nation. Most of them, however, were naturalized athletes (being born from a foreign country) in order to represent the nation in sports.

Bahrain left London with its first ever Olympic medal, won by middle-distance runner Maryam Yusuf Jamal in the women's 1500 metres.

Medalists

IOC reallocated the medals in Women's 1500 metres event due to the disqualification of the gold and silver medallists  Aslı Çakır Alptekin and Gamze Bulut, and bronze medalist Maryam Yusuf Jamal advanced to the gold.

Athletics

Qualifying standards in the athletics events include fielding up to a maximum of 3 athletes in each event at the 'A' Standard, and 1 at the 'B' Standard

Key
 Note – Ranks given for track events are within the athlete's heat only
 Q = Qualified for the next round
 q = Qualified for the next round as a fastest loser or, in field events, by position without achieving the qualifying target
 NR = National record
 N/A = Round not applicable for the event
 Bye = Athlete not required to compete in round

Men

Women

Shooting

Bahrain has one female shooter to compete in the Olympics.
Women

Swimming

Bahrain has two athletes participating in the swimming events.

Men

Women

References

External links

Nations at the 2012 Summer Olympics
2012
2012 in Bahraini sport